was a town located in Ōita District, Ōita Prefecture, Japan.

As of 2003, the town had an estimated population of 15,083 and the density of 295.17 persons per km². The total area was 51.10 km².

On October 1, 2005, Hasama, along with the towns of Shōnai and Yufuin (all from Ōita District), was merged to create the city of Yufu.

External links
 Yufu official website 

Dissolved municipalities of Ōita Prefecture